This is a list of rivers in Equatorial Guinea. This list is arranged by drainage basin, with respective tributaries indented under each larger stream's name.

Mainland
Campo River (Ntem River)
Guoro River
Kyé River
Bolo River
Mbia River
Benito River (Mbini River)
Laña River
Abia River (lower Benito River)
Abia River (upper Benito River)
Mtoro River
Nta River
Muni River
Mandyani River
Congue River
Mitong River
Mven River
Utamboni River
Mitemele River
Midyobo River
Be River
Komo River
Mbeya River
Ogooué River (Gabon)
Abanga River
Nkan River

Bioko Island
Río Bosecabosechi
Río Cónsul
Río Suhu
Río Sochi
Río Ruma
Río Iladyi
Río Moaba
Río Maloho
Río Apú

References
Army Map Service 1960
Defense Mapping Agency 1996
United Nations 2005
 GEOnet Names Server

Equatorial Guinea
Rivers